Mushtaq Ahmed Ghani (born 30 October 1956) is a Pakistani politician who is the Speaker of the Provincial Assembly of Khyber Pakhtunkhwa, and the Patron in Chief of Metrix Tech Summit (Khyber Pakhtunkhwa's Biggest Tech Summit). He had been a member of the Provincial Assembly of Khyber Pakhtunkhwa  from August 2018 till January 2023. Previously, he was a member of the Provincial Assembly of Khyber Pakhtunkhwa from 2013 to 2018 and served in the provincial cabinet of Chief Minister  Pervez Khattak as Provincial Minister for Higher Education and Information.

Early life and education
Mr. Mushtaq Ahmad Ghani son Mr. Abdul Ghani was born on 30 October, 1956 at Abbotabad. He obtained a bachelor of arts degree of from Punjab University  and E.F.L. from UK.

Political career
He was elected to the  provincial assembly member of naorh west province in 2002 pakistani genelar election a candidate of pakistan muslim league quaid azam  Provincial Assembly of Khyber Pakhtunkhwa as an independent candidate from PK-44 (Abbottabad-I) in 2013 Pakistani general election. He received 25,576 votes and defeated Inayat Ullah Khan Jadoon, a candidate of Pakistan Muslim League (N) (PML-N). Following his successful election, he announced to join Pakistan Tehreek-e-Insaf (PTI).

On 29 March 2014, he was inducted into the provincial cabinet of Chief Minister Pervez Khattak and was appointed as Provincial Minister of Khyber Pakhtunkhwa for Higher Education. On 23 July 2014, he was given the additional ministerial portfolio of Information and Public Relations where he continued to serve until October 2017.

He was re-elected to the Provincial Assembly of Khyber Pakhtunkhwa as a candidate of PTI from Constituency PK-39 (Abbottabad-IV) in 2018 Pakistani general election. Following his successful election, PTI nominated him for the office of Speaker of the Khyber Pakhtunkhwa Assembly. On 15 August, he was elected as Speaker of the Khyber Pakhtunkhwa Assembly. He received 81 votes against his opponent Laiq Muhammad Khan who received 27 votes.

References

Living people
Khyber Pakhtunkhwa MPAs 2013–2018
People from Abbottabad District
Pakistan Tehreek-e-Insaf MPAs (Khyber Pakhtunkhwa)
1956 births
Khyber Pakhtunkhwa MPAs 2018–2023
Speakers of the Provincial Assembly of Khyber Pakhtunkhwa